Cañon City School District, also known as Cañon City Schools, is a school district in Cañon City, Colorado, United States.

Schools
Cañon Exploratory School, created from combining Madison Exploratory School and Skyline Elementary School
Cañon City High School, built in 1961 allowing the former high school to become the junior high
Cañon Online Academy
Cañon City Middle School, housed in the historic 1929 Cañon City Senior High School
ECHO - Early Childhood Services
Harrison School, built to replace Harrison Elementary School and became a K-8 school
Lincoln Science and Technology School, formerly Lincoln Elementary School
McKinley Elementary School
Washington Elementary School

Former schools
 Garden Park High School
 Lincoln Exploratory School, housed in Lincoln Elementary School

References

External links

Education in Fremont County, Colorado
School districts in Colorado
Cañon City, Colorado